Liverpool Resurgent is an artwork by Jacob Epstein, mounted above the main entrance to the former Lewis's department store building in Ranelagh Street, Liverpool.  It comprises a large bronze statue and three relief panels.

The current Lewis's Building was constructed for Lewis's in 1947 by Fraser, Sons and Geary to designs by Gerald de Courcy Fraser: he had also designed the previous 1920s Lewis's store that had been destroyed by bombing in the Second World War.

It depicts a naked man standing on a plinth shaped like the prow of a ship projecting from the façade of the building, with left arm stretched out and right arm raised as if calling or signalling. It symbolises Liverpool's resurgence following the war, but it is nicknamed locally as either "Nobby Lewis" or "Dickie Lewis".

Below the statute is a modern Egyptian-style portico in Portland stone with four giant order square columns rising three floors, framing three entrance doors.  Above each door is a ciment fondu relief panel also by Epstein, installed in 1955, representing the new generation who will benefit from the rebuilding: one of children fighting, another of a baby in a pram beside a dog, and the third depicting children playing. The children are modelled on Epstein's children and grandchildren.

The work was unveiled on 20 November 1956 to celebrate the centenary of Lewis's and the completion of its reconstruction works.  The statue became known as a meeting place, and was mentioned in the 1962 song "In My Liverpool Home" by Peter McGovern:

The store closed in 2007 and the building is being redeveloped as Central Village, with retail units, a hotel and gymnasium.  It is a Grade II listed building.

References

 Who was  Dickie?, Liverpool Hidden History
 Liverpool Resurgent, Lewis’s Building, Ranelagh Place, Liverpool L1, Liverpool Walks
 Liverpool Lewis's regeneration plan revealed, BBC News, 20 September 2017
 Lewis's Department Store, National Heritage List for England, Historic England
 Liverpool Resurgent, Streets of Liverpool, 27 September 2012

Culture in Liverpool
Sculptures by Jacob Epstein
Monuments and memorials in Liverpool
Nude sculptures in the United Kingdom
Outdoor sculptures in the United Kingdom
Statues in England